The Triple-Headed Lady is a 1901 French short silent film by Georges Méliès. It was sold by Méliès's Star Film Company and is numbered 334 in its catalogues.

The film was presumed lost until 2014, when film historian Serge Bromberg identified a single deteriorated print in a collection that had belonged to Frank Brinton, a Midwestern American traveling showman of Méliès's era. The Brinton collection was also found to contain another Méliès film presumed lost, The Wonderful Rose-Tree. The Triple-Headed Lady was restored in 2016 by the film restoration studio Lobster Films, and screened that year, for the first time since its rediscovery, at the Il Cinema Ritrovato festival in Bologna.

References

External links
 
The Triple-Headed Lady on YouTube

French black-and-white films
Films directed by Georges Méliès
French silent short films